Lorenz Caffier (24 December 1954 in Weixdorf, Saxony) is a German politician who served as chairman of the Christian Democratic Union in the German state of Mecklenburg-Western Pomerania.

Political career
Caffier served as State Minister of the Interior (2006–2020) and as Deputy Minister-President of Mecklenburg-Western Pomerania (2011–2020) in the governments of Minister-Presidents Harald Ringstorff (2006–2008), Erwin Sellering (2008–2017) and Manuela Schwesig (2017–2020). As one of the state’s representatives at the Bundesrat, he chaired its Defence Committee from 2006. In addition, he led the Bundesrat delegation to the NATO Parliamentary Assembly from 2010 to 2020. He was also a member of the German-Russian Friendship Group set up by the Bundesrat and the Russian Federation Council.

Together with Stefan Mappus, Reiner Haseloff, Frank Henkel, Peter Hintze, Julia Klöckner, Christine Lieberknecht and Thomas Röwekamp, Caffier co-chaired the CDU’s national convention in Karlsruhe in 2010.

In the negotiations to form a Grand Coalition of the Christian Democrats (CDU together with the Bavarian CSU) and the Social Democrats (SPD) following the 2013 federal elections, Caffier was part of the CDU/CSU delegation in the working group on internal and legal affairs, led by Hans-Peter Friedrich and Thomas Oppermann. In similar negotiations to form a coalition government following the 2017 federal elections, he was again part of the working group on internal and legal affairs, this time led by Thomas de Maizière, Stephan Mayer and Heiko Maas.

Caffier was a CDU delegate to the Federal Convention for the purpose of electing the President of Germany in 2017.

In September 2020, Caffier announced that he would not stand in the 2021 Mecklenburg-Vorpommern state election but instead resign from active politics by the end of the legislative term.

On 17 November 2020 he resigned from his office as Minister of the Interior.

Other activities
 2011 FIFA Women's World Cup, Member of the Board of Trustees
 German Forum for Crime Prevention (DFK), Member of the Board of Trustees
 Achterkerke Stiftung für Kinder, Member of the Board of Trustees

Political positions
In 2012, Caffier caused controversy when he proposed that football fans might have to pass through "face scanners" at stadiums, comparing visitors' biometric data to a database of known football rioters.

In 2014, Caffier joined other German interior ministers in launching a suit to ban the National Democratic Party of Germany (NPD).

In an effort to respond to growing security fears among the public during the European migrant crisis in 2016, Caffier called for a partial ban on the burqa and niqab garments, arguing that the full body veil is a barrier to integration, encourages parallel societies and suggests women are inferior.

Personal life
Caffier was born on 24 December 1954 in Weixdorf (now a part of Dresden), Saxony and is the third son of a  pastor and his wife. Caffier lives in Neustrelitz with his wife.

Sources

External links
Personal website

1954 births
Living people
Politicians from Dresden
German Lutherans
Christian Democratic Union (East Germany) politicians
Christian Democratic Union of Germany politicians
Members of the 10th Volkskammer
Members of the Landtag of Mecklenburg-Western Pomerania
German people of Jewish descent